The women's heptathlon event at the 2002 Commonwealth Games was held on 26–27 July.

Medalists

Results

100 metres hurdles

High jump

Shot put

200 metres

Long jump

Javelin throw

800 metres

Final standings

References
Official results
Results at BBC

Heptathlon
2002
2002 in women's athletics